Sincerely is the eight studio album of American girl group the Emotions, released in 1984 by Red Label Records. The album reached No. 3 on the UK Blues & Soul Hiplist chart and No. 33 on the US Billboard R&B albums chart.

Critical reception

Giving a 7/10 rating Dave Hillson of Blues & Soul found that The Emotions "caught the mood of eighties Soul perfectly". Hugh Wyatt of the New York Daily News wrote "this album is top-shelf".

Singles
"You're the One" reached  No. 19 on the UK Blues & Soul Hiplist chart and No. 34 on the US Billboard Hot R&B Songs chart.

"You're the Best" also reached No. 33 on the US Billboard Dance Club Songs chart.

Track listing

References

1984 albums
The Emotions albums